Jesteburg is a Samtgemeinde ("collective municipality") in the district of Harburg, in Lower Saxony, Germany. Its seat is in the village Jesteburg.

The Samtgemeinde Jesteburg consists of the following municipalities:

 Bendestorf 
 Harmstorf 
 Jesteburg

Samtgemeinden in Lower Saxony